Nilaq (also Romanized as Nīlaq and Neylaq; also known as Lailia, Leyleyeh, and Ley-lya) is a village in Sanjabad-e Gharbi Rural District, in the Central District of Kowsar County, Ardabil Province, Iran. At the 2006 census, its population was 709, in 143 families.

References 

Tageo

Towns and villages in Kowsar County